Aleksandr Mikhaylovich Saprykin (28 July 1946 – 4 May 2021) was a Russian volleyball player who competed for the Soviet Union in the 1972 Summer Olympics.

In 1972 he was part of the Soviet team which won the bronze medal in the Olympic tournament. He played all seven matches.

References

External links
 

1946 births
2021 deaths
Soviet men's volleyball players
Olympic volleyball players of the Soviet Union
Volleyball players at the 1972 Summer Olympics
Olympic bronze medalists for the Soviet Union
Olympic medalists in volleyball
Russian men's volleyball players
Medalists at the 1972 Summer Olympics
Sportspeople from Kaluga
Lesgaft National State University of Physical Education, Sport and Health alumni